Lokissara was a soldier who was enlisted with an army abroad and defeated the Royal Polonnaruwa Army deposing Lilavati. Lokissara ruled for nine months from 1210 to 1211 before the Royal Army restored Lilavati for the third time.

See also
 List of Sri Lankan monarchs
 History of Sri Lanka

References

External links
 Kings & Rulers of Sri Lanka
 Codrington's Short History of Ceylon

Monarchs of Polonnaruwa
Usurpers of the Sinhalese throne
L